Gursahibjit Singh (born 5 February 1999) is an Indian field hockey player who plays as a forward for the national team. Six months after representing India Under-21 at the 2018 Sultan of Johor Cup, he made his senior team debut at the 2019 Sultan Azlan Shah Cup.

References

External links
Gursahibjit Singh at Hockey India

1999 births
Living people
Indian male field hockey players
Field hockey players from Punjab, India
People from Gurdaspur district